Mykland is a former municipality in the old Aust-Agder county in Norway. The  municipality existed from 1876 until 1967 when it was merged into the neighboring municipality of Froland in what is now Agder county. Mykland included the inland areas between the rivers Tovdalsåna and the Rettåna (a tributary of the river Otra). The administrative centre was the village of Mykland where the Mykland Church is located.

The main roads through the municipality were Norwegian County Road 42 and Norwegian County Road 413.

History

The parish of Mykland was originally part of the municipality of Åmli. Mykland was established as a municipality in 1876, when the southern parish of Mykland was split off to be a separate municipality. Initially, the population of Mykland was 663. This left Åmli with a population of 2,564. During the 1960s, there were many municipal mergers across Norway due to the work of the Schei Committee. After much debate in Mykland, a vote was held on whether or not to join Åmli to the north, Froland to the east, or Birkenes to the south.  A majority voted for Froland, some voted for Åmli, and no one voted to join Birkenes.  Therefore, on 1 January 1967, Mykland was merged into the neighboring municipality of Froland. Prior to the merger, Mykland had a population of 604. On 1 January 1970, the uninhabited properties of Neset and Råbudal in Froland (which had been a part of Mykland until 1967) were moved to Birkenes municipality.

Name
The municipality (originally the parish) is named after the old Mykland farm, since the first Mykland Church was built there.

Government
All municipalities in Norway, including Mykland, are responsible for primary education (through 10th grade), outpatient health services, senior citizen services, unemployment and other social services, zoning, economic development, and municipal roads. The municipality was governed by a municipal council of elected representatives, which in turn elected a mayor.

Municipal council
The municipal council  of Mykland was made up of 13 representatives that were elected to four year terms.  The party breakdown of the final municipal council was as follows:

See also
List of former municipalities of Norway

References

Froland
Former municipalities of Norway
1876 establishments in Norway
1967 disestablishments in Norway